Sol Gareth "Garry" Davis (27 July 1921 – 24 July 2013) was an international peace activist best known for renouncing his American citizenship and interrupting the United Nations in 1948 to advocate for world government as a way to end nationalistic wars. 
His actions gained international attention, including support from intellectuals such as Albert Camus and Albert Einstein, but ridicule from Eleanor Roosevelt.

Davis, a World Federalist, founded the non-profit World Service Authority in 1953 to educate and promote World government. The World Service Authority issues "world government documents", such as the World Passport, a fantasy travel document based on his interpretation of Article 13(2), Universal Declaration of Human Rights and on the concept of world citizenship. Previously, Davis had worked as a Broadway stage actor and understudy for Danny Kaye.  He served as an American bomber pilot in World War II.

Early life 
Davis was born in Bar Harbor, Maine (U.S.), to Meyer and Hilda (née Emery) Davis. His parents were Jewish and Irish, respectively. He graduated from The Episcopal Academy in 1940 and attended the Carnegie Institute of Technology (now Carnegie Mellon University).

Career 
Davis was a Broadway actor who served as understudy for Danny Kaye and performed for him the musical Let's Face It!
He also played a leading role in the Broadway hit Three to Get Ready.

Davis served in the U.S. Army during the Second World War as B-17 bomber pilot.

Advocacy for world government 

Pained by his own brother's war death and at the death he caused other families by bombing the city of Brandenburg in World War II, and fearful that nuclear war could terminate humanity, Davis's relinquishment of United States nationality in 1948 led him to declare himself a "citizen of the world". He mentioned Henry Martyn Noel, who had renounced a few months earlier, as one of his inspirations.

In France, his "Garry Davis Council of Solidarity" support committee was co-founded by writers Albert Camus, André Breton and Claude Bourdet, and Emmaus movement originator Abbé Pierre, as well as Robert Sarrazac, a former leader of the French Résistance who joined Davis in founding the Citoyens du monde (World Citizens movement).
Davis interrupted a session of the United Nations General Assembly on 19 November 1948, "We, the people, want the peace which only a world government can give", he proclaimed. "The sovereign states you represent divide us and lead us to the abyss of total war." Along with his support committee, he rallied over 15,000 people in Paris to demand that the UN recognize the rights of Humanity. Eleanor Roosevelt ridiculed his stunts in her My Day column as "flash-in-the-pan publicity".

Davis founded the International Registry of World Citizens in Paris in January 1949, which registered over 750,000 individuals. On September 4, 1953, Davis formed an organisation, the World Government of World Citizens, with the stated aim of furthering fundamental human rights. 

He additionally formed the World Service Authority in 1954 as the government's executive and administrative agency, which issues its own fantasy passports – along with fantasy birth and other certificates – to customers. Davis first used his World Passport on a trip to India in 1956, and was allegedly admitted into some countries using it.

Davis ran for mayor in Washington, D.C. in 1986 as the candidate of the "World Citizen Party" receiving 585 votes. He also declared himself as the World Citizen Party candidate for the 1988 US presidential election. Davis published multiple books in favor of his cause of world citizenship.

At the 1992 Earth Summit in Rio de Janeiro, Davis issued and disbursed a world currency based on kilowatt-hours of solar power produced, an idea proposed by Buckminster Fuller. These "kilowatt dollars" were the earliest documented emissions reduction currency.

In March 2012, at age 90, Davis began broadcasting a weekly radio show, "World Citizen Radio", on the Global Radio Alliance.

Attempts to help Julian Assange and Edward Snowden 
In 2012, Davis sent WikiLeaks founder Julian Assange a World Passport. Only weeks before he died, Davis sent a World Passport to whistleblower Edward Snowden in Moscow in care of the Russian authorities.

Death 
Davis entered hospice care on 18 July 2013, and died six days later in the municipality of South Burlington, Vermont, three days shy of his 92nd birthday. He was survived by a daughter from his first marriage, Kristina Starr Davis; two sons, Troy and Kim; and a daughter, Athena Davis from his third marriage; as well as two siblings and a granddaughter.

Bibliography

References

Further reading
 Views from My Space (2009) 
 World Peace Is You (ebook)
 Views From My SpaceBook II (2011) 
 World Citizen Garry Davis Goes to Court (2011) 
 "What's a World Passport?" Daniel Engber, Slate Magazine. Accessed 25 March 2006.
 Davis v. District Director. INS, 481 F. Supp. 1178 (D.D.C. 1979) Accessed 4 November 2006.

External links 

 
 World Government of World Citizens website, created by Davis
 Garry Davis' blog
 Short documentary clip about Garry's life
 New York Times article, 28 July 2013
 LIFE magazine article, 24 January 1949
 Washington Post article, 6 August 2013
 Los Angeles Times article, 1 August 2013
 Kilowatt dollar explained
 
 Garry Davis – Broadway Cast & Staff - IBDB
 Let's Face It! – Broadway Musical – Original - IBDB

1921 births
2013 deaths
American male stage actors
American anti-war activists
United States Army Air Forces bomber pilots of World War II
People who renounced United States citizenship
Stateless people
People from Bar Harbor, Maine
Male actors from Maine
Carnegie Mellon University alumni
Candidates in the 1988 United States presidential election
20th-century American politicians
World federalist activists
Writers about globalization
Activists from Maine